Palong Tulasar Gurudas Government High School is a secondary school in Shariatpur District, Bangladesh. Founded in 1898, it is located at Tulaser in the Shariatpur Sadar Upazila area.

Clubs
These include:
 English Club
 Science Club
 Computer Club
 Debating Club
 Cultural Club
 Writers Club etc.

References

High schools in Bangladesh
1898 establishments in India
Shariatpur District